António Victorino de Almeida  (born 21 May 1940) is a Portuguese composer, music teacher, pianist and writer from Lisbon. He has also directed several films and television programmes about music. He is the father of actresses Maria de Medeiros and Inês de Medeiros and the violinist and composer Anne Victorino de Almeida.

Distinctions

National orders
 Grand Cross of the Order of Prince Henry the Navigator (9 June 2005)

See also
List of Portuguese composers

References

1940 births
Living people
People from Lisbon
Portuguese composers
Portuguese male composers
Portuguese pianists
Portuguese opera composers
Portuguese film directors
Portuguese male writers
Male pianists
21st-century pianists
21st-century male musicians
Grand Crosses of the Order of Prince Henry